Revelations is an American apocalyptic drama television miniseries created by David Seltzer and based on the Book of Revelation. The series follows two central characters, an astrophysicist (Bill Pullman) and a nun (Natascha McElhone), in a race against time to see if the end of the world can be averted. It also stars Michael Massee, Mark Rendall, Chelsey Coyle, Brittney Coyle, John Rhys-Davies, Orla Brady, Alexa Nikolas, Tobin Bell, Martin Starr, Fred Durst, and Caryn Green.

Synopsis

Dr. Richard Massey, a noted astrophysicist from Harvard, returns home after having hunted down the Satanist that brutally murdered his daughter Lucy in a satanic ritual. The Satanist, a man named Isaiah Haden, is put into prison awaiting trial. Richard Massey is a man of science and does not believe in religion at all. He is bitter at his loss and the general poor state of his life and only wants to see Isaiah Haden face his punishment.

Meanwhile, a nun named Josepha Montafiore who is working for the Eklind Foundation, a wealthy traditionalist Catholic organization, visits the bedside of a comatose girl. The child was struck twice by lightning while crossing a golf course and lives in a vegetative state. However, the girl mumbles Bible verses in Latin and draws cryptic drawings. Josepha believes that this is an act of God and decides to pursue it.

The girl's visions lead Josepha to Richard, who joins her on her quest to document and unravel signs of the End of Days. Their journey eventually becomes a race against time to thwart Haden's followers as they try to bring about the Apocalypse, all while hot on the trail of a child who may be able to save them all.

Cast
 Bill Pullman as Dr. Richard Massey
 Natascha McElhone as Sister Josepha Montafiore
 Michael Massee as Isaiah Haden
 Mark Rendall as Henry "Hawk" Webber
 Chelsey Coyle as Olivia "Livvie" Beaudrey
 Brittney Coyle as Olivia "Livvie" Beaudrey
 John Rhys-Davies as Professor Lampley
 Orla Brady as Nora Webber
 Alexa Nikolas as Lucy Massey
 Tobin Bell as Nathan Volk
 Martin Starr as Mark Rubio
 Fred Durst as Ogden
 Caryn Green as Tulia
 Fionnula Flanagan as Mother Francine
 Jesper Christensen as Torvald Eklind
 Paul Venables as Tom Webber
 Jonathan Whittaker as Nelson Boyd
 Winter Ave Zoli as Anna-Theresa
 Clémence Poésy as E.C.
 Christopher Biggins as Cardinal Laveigh
 Werner Daehn as Asteroth
 Patrick Bauchau as Dr. Daniel Goran
 Davenia McFadden as Sister Delise
 Joel Polis as Hospital Administrator
 James Bigwood as Prison Chaplain

Awards and nominations

References

External links
 
 

2005 American television series debuts
2005 American television series endings
2000s American drama television series
2000s American mystery television series
2000s American supernatural television series
2000s American television miniseries
American religious television series
American thriller television series
Apocalyptic television series
English-language television shows
NBC original programming
Religious drama television series
Television series based on the Bible
Television series by Universal Television
Television shows filmed in Italy
Television shows filmed in Los Angeles
Television shows filmed in the Czech Republic